Corriere del Mezzogiorno is an Italian local newspaper owned by RCS MediaGroup and based in Naples, Italy, with editorial offices in all over Southern Italy. It was launched in 1997 in Campania to handle the growing competition with la Repubblica. The Apulian edition was launched in 2002.

References

External links
 

1997 establishments in Italy
Italian-language newspapers
Newspapers published in Naples
Newspapers established in 1997
Daily newspapers published in Italy